The Dinamulag Festival also known as the Zambales Mango Festival is an annual festival held in the province of Zambales in the Philippines to celebrate or encourage bountiful harvest of the province's mangoes. The festival was first held in 1999. The mascot is a mango.

Background

Mangoes are a primary crop of the province of Zambales. Mangoes harvest in the town of Palauig are mostly exported to other provinces and Metro Manila. The festival is held to celebrate bountiful harvest of mangoes in the provinces.

Mangoes cultivated in Zambales particularly the Dinamulag variety of Carabao mangoes were cited as the world's sweetest mangoes by Guinness World Records in 1995 and the country's sweetest mangoes by the Department of Agriculture in 2013.

In 2015, other events unrelated to the province's mangoes such as sports events were introduced while the province's fruit remain the centerpiece of the festival.

18th Dinamulag Festival
|GOVERNOR AMOR DELOSO]]
The 18th Dinamulag Festival was held on APRIL 4-8,2017 at IBA PEOPLE'S PARK in Iba, Zambales.

One of the highlights of the said festival was the Street Dancing Competition, which The Masinloc Street Dancers won. They also have the most titles with 7 on the said event.

Some of the guest of the said event are Senator Teofisto "TG" Guingona, Chicser Group among others. Also came to the said festival are some local officials of Zambales like mwahIba Mayor Rundstedt Ebdane, Botolan Mayor Bing Maniquiz, Candelaria Mayor Napoleon Edquid, Board Member Renato Collado, Board Member Sancho Abasta Jr.

Events and Highlights

 Street Dancing Competition, a Street Dancing Event.
 Binibining Zambales, A Beauty Pageant Event.
 LARONG LAHI
 Pet Show, 
 LIKHANG BUHANGIN SAND SCULPTING COMPETITION
 Mr & Ms Body Beautiful, A Beauty Pageant Event.
 Zamba Tuklas Talento, A Talent Event,
 FUN RUN
ZAMBALES COOKFEST
BAYLE ZAMBALES STREET DANCING PARADE AND SHOWDOWN
Fireworks Display, A Fireworks Display Event

Results

Street Dancing Competition

Binibining Zambales

References

....

Harvest festivals
Cultural festivals in the Philippines
Culture of Zambales